Boris may refer to:

People
 Boris (given name), a male given name
See: List of people with given name Boris
 Boris (surname)
 Boris I of Bulgaria (died 907), the first Christian ruler of the First Bulgarian Empire, canonized after his death
 Boris II of Bulgaria (c. 931–977), ruler of the First Bulgarian Empire
 Boris III of Bulgaria (1894–1943), ruler of the Kingdom of Bulgaria in the first half of the 20th century
 Boris, Prince of Tarnovo (born 1997), Spanish-born Bulgarian royal
 Boris and Gleb (died 1015), the first saints canonized in Kievan Rus
 Boris (singer) (born 1965), pseudonym of French singer Philippe Dhondt

Arts and media
 Boris (band), a Japanese experimental rock trio
 Boris (EP), by Yezda Urfa, 1975
 "Boris" (song), by the Melvins, 1991
 Boris (TV series), a 2007–2009 Italian comedy series
 Boris: The Film, a 2011 Italian film based on the TV series
 Boris: The Rise of Boris Johnson, a 2006 biography by Andrew Gimson

Other uses
 Boris (crater), a lunar crater
 Hurricane Boris (disambiguation), several cyclones in the Eastern Pacific
 Boris stones, seven medieval artifacts in Belarus
 Boris, a tribe of the Adi people

See also
 Borris (disambiguation)

sv:Boris#Övrigt